Dong Wenjing (born 15 June 1998) is a Chinese badminton player from Guangxi. She was part of the national women's team that won the silver medal at the 2018 Badminton Asia Team Championships held in Alor Setar, Malaysia. Dong also play for the national team at the 2019 Asia Mixed Team Championships, clinched a gold medal and won the Tong Yun Kai Cup.

References

External links

1998 births
Living people
Badminton players from Guangxi
Chinese female badminton players
21st-century Chinese women